Brace's Bakery is a Crumlin-based Welsh bakery and bakery products brand.

Founders
Born in Abercarn, George Brace, an engine house driver at the Cambrian Colliery in Clydach Vale, started with a loan from his family a small bakery in 1902 in Pontllanfraith. Worked by his family, George continued to work at the colliery until the 1905 mining disaster which killed 35 men, after which George left the mining industry and started to build his bakery business. George and his wife had five sons and two daughters, raised in a house next to the bakery with the shop at the front of it, called Cambrian House, in Pontllanfraith Monmouthshire.

William Brace, George's brother, was a miners' activist who was elected an MP in 1906 for South Glamorganshire within the Lloyd George government, and from 1918 sat for Abertillery. In 1919 William persuaded the then owners of Oakdale Colliery, the Tredegar Iron and Coal Company to hand the franchise of the bakery in the village over to George's eldest son, Ernest, who had just left the Royal Flying Corps after service in World War I. After this success, George persuaded each of his children to start bakeries in various towns and villages across the South Wales Valleys.

Ernest the eldest son successfully built his business in Oakdale, and in the late 1930s his business bought his father's business, George Brace & Sons. After Ernest's retirement, he passed the business on to his son Colin, who subsequently passed the running of the business on to his sons, Mark and Jonathan Brace.

Expansion
Changing the business from a local baker with shops and vans, to a regional bread manufacturer the "Number 1" bread brand in South Wales and the West Country and also supplying some products nationally. In 2004 Brace's purchased another  factory unit one mile away and invested £10 million installing the most up to date plant bakery, which can produce up to 900,000 loaves a week. Brace's operates plants in Croespenmaen and Pen-y-Fan Industrial Estate with in a mile of each other near Blackwood, and in February 2011 bought an existing facility in Rogerstone. The Rogertone site was closed in 2017 and rented to another Baking company.

In 2011, Brace's came 57th on the Price Waterhouse Coopers/Sunday Times Profit Track 100 survey.

Exports
Braces Bakery started exporting their bread to Europe in 2011 through international export company, Foodlynx. The exports of Braces Bread grew dramatically in 2012. Braces Bread can now be found in Spain, Portugal, Malta, Greece and Cyprus and is distributed to many hotels and restaurants by European Foodservice Companies as well as being sold in European supermarkets.

References

External links
 Home page

Food and drink companies of Wales
Bakeries of the United Kingdom
Family-owned companies of the United Kingdom
Privately held companies of Wales